No. 308 "City of  Kraków" Polish Fighter Squadron RAF was one of several Polish squadrons in the Royal Air Force (RAF) during the Second World War. It was formed as part of an agreement between the Polish Government in Exile and the United Kingdom in 1940.

History
The squadron was formed on 5 September 1940 at the RAF Polish Depot in Squires Gate,  Blackpool, from pilots of the Fighter Squadron of the 2nd Aviation Regiment in Krakow (in September 1939 the regiment was part of the Krakow Army).  The personnel list was approved on 9 September 1940, and on 12 September the squadron of 170 personnel were transferred to Speke Airport near Liverpool for initial training.  It was supplied with Miles Master (trainers) and Hawker Hurricane fighters.  The first CO, Squadron Leader John Davies, was killed after striking a balloon cable just a few weeks after taking command. 

On 24 November 1940, the first air victory was recorded on the Squadron's account when Pilot Mieczysław Parafiński downed a twin-engine Ju-88 bomber during a training flight.

The squadron began combat service on 1 December 1940, also preparing for night flights in order to repel Luftwaffe night raids.

By October 1941 the squadron was based at Baginton Aerodrome where "Tommy" Yeo-Thomas was intelligence officer. It then converted to Spitfires and operated from RAF Northolt.  The new equipment was quickly mastered by the pilots, as evidenced by the success of 2nd Lt. pil. Wandzilak, who was the first of the PSP pilots to shoot down an Fw-190 on 21 September 1941.

The squadron was then operated over France before its transfer to the 2nd Tactical Air Force in 1943 as a fighter-bomber squadron.   Its main task became the destruction of ground targets. Squadron pilots destroyed a total of 536 land vehicles, 17 locomotives, 109 wagons, 45 ships and 28 buildings. The squadron then followed the allied advance across Europe after the Normandy Landings in 1944.  It disbanded at RAF Ahlhorn, Germany on 18 December 1946 after hostilities had ceased.

308 Squadron was one of the most effective PSP fighter units (69 certain kills, 13 probable, 21 damage).

Aircraft operated

See also
Polish Air Forces in Great Britain
Polish contribution to World War II

References

External links

 History of No.'s 300–318 Squadrons at RAF Web
 308 Squadron history on the official RAF website
 Personnel of the Polish Air Force in Great Britain 1940-1947
 308 Squadron pictures

308
308
Military units and formations established in 1940
Military units and formations disestablished in 1946